Svend Olling (born 9 November 1967 in Glostrup) is a Danish diplomat, who is currently the Danish Ambassador to Egypt since August 2020. He presented his Credentials to President of the Arab Republic of Egypt H.E. Abdel Fattah El-Sisi on 23 September 2020.   

Svend Olling graduated from the University of Copenhagen in 1994 with a Master of Science in Economics. He has served in the embassies in Washington, D.C., United States and in Berlin, Germany. From 2010 to 2013, he was the Danish Ambassador in Dhaka, Bangladesh and from September 2016 to 2020 the Danish Ambassador in Ankara, Turkey and Azerbaijan. In the Danish Foreign Ministry, Svend Olling has primarily worked with European Affairs, Security Policy, Export Promotion and IT. He was also involved in hosting the Copenhagen Climate Change Conference COP15 in 2009.

Svend Olling has three children: Asbjørn (1997), Astrid (1999) and Ingrid Kjær Olling (2004).

Svend Olling was appointed Knight of the Order of the Dannebrog in 2008.

References

Publications 
 "Ambassadørens krystalkugle: 2016 var ikke et godt år for Tyrkiet", Jyllands-Posten. 5 January 2017. 
 "Tragedien i Savar", Altinget.dk. 13 May 2013.

External links 
 Denmark in Turkey web page

1967 births
Living people
Ambassadors of Denmark to Turkey
University of Copenhagen alumni
Ambassadors of Denmark to Azerbaijan
People from Glostrup Municipality